The Farrer Football Netball League (FFNL) is an Australian rules football and netball competition containing nine clubs based in the Riverina region of New South Wales, Australia. The league features three grades in the Australian rules football competition, with these being First-Grade, Reserve-Grade and Under 17s. In the netball competition there are four grades, with these being A-Grade, A-Reserve Grade, B-Grade and C-Grade.

The Farrer FNL is named after William Farrer, a leading English Australian agronomist and plant breeder. Farrer is best remembered as the originator of the "Federation" strain of wheat, distributed in 1903. His work resulted in significant improvements in both the quality and crop yields of Australia's national wheat harvest, a contribution for which he earned the title 'father of the Australian wheat industry'.

Currently a home and away season consisting of eighteen rounds is played. The best five teams then play off according to the McIntyre system, culminating in the FFNL Grand Final, which is traditionally held at Maher Oval in Wagga Wagga.

History

Breakaway
The Farrer Football League first formed in 1957 as a breakaway from the Albury & District Football League. Culcairn, Henty, Holbrook and Mangoplah-Cookardinia United competed in the first season. In 1958 all remaining clubs from the Albury & District Football League moved across to the new league.

The Farrer FL senior football best and fairest medal was called the Baz Medal, which was first donated in 1952 by Mr. Mick Baz of Culcairn as the award in the Albury & District Football League, which was carried on into the Farrer FL.

In 1976, the Farrer FL won the NSW State Championships series held at Finley in June, defeating the Sydney Football League and the South West District FL.

The name of the best and fairest award from 1982 onwards has been the Gerald Clear Award.

Restructure
It was in 1982 that the Farrer Football League amalgamated with the South West Football League (New South Wales) and the Central Riverina Football League in order to create the Riverina Football League and the Riverina District Football League, with the latter changing its name to the Farrer Football League in 1985. It was between 1983 and 1994 that the Riverina District/Farrer Football League maintained a two division system, with a promotion / relegation system in force during that time.

Timeframe

1930 - 1957: Albury & District Football League
1957 - 1981: Farrer Football League
1982: Riverina District Football League
1983 - 1984: Riverina District Football League - Division One
1983 - 1984: Riverina District Football League - Division Two
1985 - 1994: Farrer Football League - Division One
1985 - 1994: Farrer Football League - Division Two
1995 - 2023: Farrer Football League

Notable players
The following former Farrer FL players played senior VFL / AFL football, with the year indicating their VFL / AFL debut.
Farrer Football League

 1966 - Doug Priest - Holbrook to South Melbourne
 1969 - John Pitura (Wagga Tigers)
 1975 - Colin Hounsell (Collingullie)
 1979 - Wayne Carroll - Mangoplah Cookardinia United to South Melbourne
 1980 - Greg Smith (East Wagga)
 1981 - Brett Scott (The Rock-Yerong Creek)
 1987 - Michael Phyland (Mangoplah-Cookardinia United)

 1989 - Glenn Page - (Collingullie-Ashmont)
 1995 - Jason Wild (Collingullie-Ashmont)
 2000 - Ben Fixter - Rivcol to Sydney Swans
 2011 - Luke Breust (Temora)
 2011 - Issac Smith - Temora to Hawthorn
 2013 - Jake Barrett (Temora)

Current clubs

Notes

Previous clubs 
{| class="wikitable sortable" " style="width:100%"
|-
! Club
! Nickname
! Years in Competition
! Premierships
! Premiership Years
! Moved to
|-
| Ardlethan
| Stars
| 1987-2003
| 0
| None
| Amalgamated with Ariah Park-Mirrool Brown Bombers to form Northern Jets in 2004
|-
| Ariah Park-Mirrool
| Brown Bombers
| 1991-2003
| 0
| None
| Amalgamated with Ardlethan Stars to form Northern Jets in 2004
|-
| Barellan United
| '| 1982 - 1992
| 0
| None
| Played in the Northern Riverina Football League from 1993 to 2014. In 1955 Barellan amalgamated with Binya, then in 1970 Barellan-Binya, Kamarah-Moombooldool and Sandy Creek amalgamated to become Barellan United.
|-
| Boree Creek
| Creekers
| 1982
| 0
| None
| Disbanded after the 1982 season in the Farrer Football League
|-
| Collingullie
| Swans
| 1965 - 1979
| 2
| 1969, 1974
| Merged with Ashmont in 1980 to form Collingullie Ashmont FC.
|-
| Collingullie-Ashmont-Kapooka
| Demons
| 1980-1994; 1998-2010
| 8
| 1982, 84, 99, 2002, 03, 08, 09, 10
| Joined the Riverina FL in 2011 & renamed Collingullie Glenfield Park in 2015.
|-
| Cootamundra
| Blues
| 1982-2003
| 2
|  1989 1992 (2nd division)
| AFL Canberra in 2004
|-
| Culcairn
| Lions
| 1957-1980
| 2
| 1963, 1968  
| Joined the Tallangatta & District Football League in 1981
|-
| East Wagga
| Hawks
| 1977 - 1981, 2010 - 2023
| 0
| None
| Joined from the Central Riverina FL in 1977. Joined the Riverina FL in 1982. Returned to the Farrer FL in 2010.
|-
| Henty
| Swans
| 1957-1979
| 0
| None
| Joined the Hume Football League in 1980.
|-
| Holbrook
| Brookers
| 1957-1980
| 2
| 1964, 1970
| Joined the Tallangatta & DFL in 1981, then joined the Hume FNL in 1999.
|-

| Lavington
| Blues
| 1977 & 1978
| 0
| None
| Joined the Ovens & Murray Football League in 1979.
|-
| Lockhart
| Demons
| 1958-1981
| 1
| 1960
| Joined the Hume Football League in 1982
|-
| Junee
| Bulldogs
| 1987
| 0
| None
| Disbanded after the 1987 season in the Farrer FL - Division Two competition.
|-
| Junee-Kapooka
| Bulldogs
| 1982-1986
| 0
| None
| Disbanded
|-
| Mangoplah Cookardinia United
| Goannas
| 1957-1994
| 12
| 1957, 65, 66, 67, 71, 72, 74, 85, 88, 89, 90, 93
| Riverina Football League in 1995
|-
| North Wagga
| Saints
| 1958-81, 1985-2006, 2010–23
| 0
| None
| Played in the Riverina FL from 1982 to 1984, then returned to the Farrer FL in 1985. Went into recess in 2007, then played in the Riverina FL in  2008 and 2009.
|-
| RCAE
| Bush Pigs
| 1982 - 2023
| 0
| None
| Joined from the Central Riverina FL in 1982. The club has had several name changes over the years. Rivcoll, RCAE to the current Charles Stuart University FNC.
|-
| Royal Australian Air Force
| Cats
| 1982-1996
| 0
| None
| Amalgamated with North Wagga Saints in 1997
|-
| South Wagga-Tolland
| Dons
| 1982-1997
| 4 (Div 2)
| None
| Disbanded in 1998. Red jumper, with a black V.
|-
| The Rock
| ?
| 1958 - 1961
| 0
| None
| Amalgamated with Yerong Creek in 1962 to form The Rock Yerong Creek.
|-
|Tumut
|Hawks
|1986-1987
|0
|None
|Disbanded after the 1987 FFNL season. Also competed in the Central Riverina Football League (1970-1977) & the "Upper Murray Football League" (1978-1985), winning the 1982 UMFL senior premiership.
|-
| Uranquinty
| Rosellas
| 1985-1986
| 0
| None
| Amalgamated with Kapooka to form Uranquinty-Kapooka Rosellas
|-
| Uranquinty-Kapooka
| Rosellas
| 1987-1998
| 0
| None
| Amalgamated with Collingullie-Ashmont Demons to form Collingullie-Ashmont-Kapooka Demons in 1999
|-
| Wagga Tigers
| Tigers
| 1958 - 1981
| 9
| 1958-59, 1961–62, 1975, 1977–78, 1980–81
| Joined the Riverina Football League in 1982
|-
| Whitton
| Tigers
| 1982-1990
| 0
| None
| Amalgamated with Yanco to form Whitton-Yanco Tigers in 1991
|-
| Whitton-Yanco
| Tigers
| 1991 - 1994
| 0
| None
| Amalgamated with Leeton Demons to form Leeton-Whitton Crows in 1995
|-
| Yerong Creek
| Magpies
| 1957-1961
| 0
| None
| Amalgamated with The Rock FC to form The Rock Yerong Creek FC in 1962.
|-
|}

Leading & century goal kickers / League Best & Fairest Winners
Seniors
The Farrer FL senior football best and fairest medal was called the Baz Medal, which was first donated in 1952 by Mr. Mick Baz of Culcairn Cash Store as the award in the Albury & District Football League, which was carried on into the Farrer FL.

 List of football premiers 
First-Grade

Reserve-Grade1957: MCU d Culcairn1958: Wagga d Henty1959: Wagga d Henty1960: Henty d Wagga1961: Henty d The Rock1962: Culcairn d Wagga1963: Henty d Holbrook1964: Wagga d Holbrook1965: Wagga d North Wagga1966: Holbrook d Wagga1967: Lockhart d Wagga1968: Wagga d TRYC1969: TRYC d Wagga1970: Wagga d TRYC1971: Holbrook d Henty1972: TRYC d Culcairn1973: Culcairn d MCU1974: MCU d TRYC1975: Wagga d MCU1976: Wagga d Nth Wagga1977: Wagga d Nth Wagga1978: North Wagga d Wagga1979: EWK d Wagga1980: Wagga d Temora1981: North Wagga d Wagga1982: Junee-Kapooka1983: Mangoplah-Cookardinia United1984: Mangoplah-Cookardinia United1985: Temora1986: Temora1987: Temora1988: Barellan United1989: The Rock-Yerong Creek1990: The Rock-Yerong Creek1991: Mangoplah-Cookardinia United1992: Collingullie-Ashmont1993: North Wagga1994: North Wagga1995: Marrar1996: Ariah Park-Mirrool1997: Cootamundra1998: Ariah Park-Mirrool1999: Ariah Park-Mirrool2000: The Rock-Yerong Creek2001: Collingullie-Ashmont-Kapooka2002: Collingullie-Ashmont-Kapooka2003: Ariah Park-Mirrool2004: North Wagga2005: Northern Jets2006: Northern Jets2007: Northern Jets2008: Collingullie-Ashmont-Kapooka2009: Rivcoll2010: Charles Sturt University2011: Marrar2012: The Rock-Yerong Creek2013: North Wagga2014: East Wagga-Kooringal2015: East Wagga-Kooringal2016: East Wagga-Kooringal2017: North Wagga2018: Marrar2019: East Wagga-Kooringal 

Under 17s/18s
Under 19's1980: RAAF d EWK1981: MCU d Wagga1982: Mangoplah-Cookardinia United1983: South Wagga-Tolland1984: Mangoplah-Cookardinia United1985: Mangoplah-Cookardinia United1986: The Rock-Yerong Creek1987: Collingullie-Ashmont1988: Collingullie-Ashmont1989: Mangoplah-Cookardinia United1990: Mangoplah-Cookardinia United1991: Mangoplah-Cookardinia United1992: Temora1993: Temora1994: Temora

Under 17s2009: Northern Jets2010: North Wagga2011: Temora2012: North Wagga2013: No Competition2014: North Wagga2015: Northern Jets2016: North Wagga2017: Temora2018: Marrar2019:''' Marrar

Riverina District / Farrer FL Division Two Grand Finals
Seniors

 In 1995, the Farrer Football League became a one division senior football competition.

Leading & century goal kickers / League Best & Fairest Winners
Riverina District FL / Farrer FL - Division Two 
Seniors

 Goals tally does not include goals kicked in the finals series.
In 1995, the Farrer Football League became a one division competition.
MOST GOALS IN A MATCH: 1988 - Eric Frazer - South Wagga Tolland v RAAF at Forest Hill, 13th August 1988.

2010 Ladder 
Seniors

2011 Ladder

2012 Ladder

2013 Ladder

2014 Ladder

2015 Ladder

2016 Ladder

2017 Ladder

2018 Ladder

2019 Ladder

See also 
AFL Canberra
AFL NSW/ACT
Albury & District Football League
Australian rules football in New South Wales
Hume Football League
Northern Riverina Football League
South West Football League (New South Wales)
Riverina Football League
Group 9 Rugby League
Group 17 Rugby League

External links
Official Farrer Football League website
AFL Riverina
Albury & District FL Premiership & Best & Fairest Lists. 1930 to 1957 (page 20)
Australian rules football in New South Wales
Albury & District Football League
Central Hume Football Association
Central Riverina Football League
Central Riverina FL - "CRFL Weekly Record"
Coreen & District Football League
Hume Football Netball League
Riverina Football Association
Riverina Football Netball League
1988 Farrer FL Division Two Premiers/ South Wagga Tolland FC team photo

Sport in the Riverina
Australian rules football competitions in New South Wales
Sport in Wagga Wagga